Joyce Millman is an American television and music critic and writer on  popular culture. Her work has been published in The New York Times and The San Francisco Examiner. She was a two-time finalist in criticism for the Pulitzer Prize in 1989 and 1991 for her Examiner columns. She was one of the founders of the online magazine Salon.

References

Living people
American women journalists
Year of birth missing (living people)
American women writers
21st-century American women